Tehuipango is a municipality located in the montane central zone in the State of Veracruz, about 110 km from state capital Xalapa. It has a surface of 111.04 km2. Santiago Tehuipango, it was a people belonging to Zongolica's federation, during the 16th century, later it tried to form its own town hall; in 1831 a municipality was consisting already of basics schools and parish of masonry. It was bordering on Mixtla, Eloxitlan, Alcomunga, Astacinga and Texhuacán.

Geographic Limits

The municipality of  Tehuipango  is delimited to the north by Astacinga, Mixtla de Altamirano and Zongolica and to the south by Puebla State. It is watered by the Rio Moyoteampa that is a tributary of the affluent Idiot of the river Papaloapan.

Agriculture

It produces principally maize, plum, apple, pea and faba bean.

Celebrations

In  Tehuipango , in July takes place the celebration in honor to Santiago Apostol, Patron of the town, and in December takes place the celebration in honor to Virgen de Guadalupe.

Weather

The weather in  Tehuipango  is very cold and wet all year with rains in summer and autumn.

References

External links 

  Municipal Official webpage
  Municipal Official Information

Municipalities of Veracruz